Christopher Lamont (born 6 January 1988) is a Jamaican cricketer.

Domestic career
Lamont made his first-class debut for Jamaica in the 2017–18 Regional Four Day Competition on 14 December 2017. He made his List A debut for Jamaica in the 2017–18 Regional Super50 on 2 February 2018.

Lamont made his Twenty20 debut for St Lucia Stars in the 2018 Caribbean Premier League on 2 September 2018, and was named the man of the match. In October 2019, he was named in Jamaica's squad for the 2019–20 Regional Super50 tournament.

References

External links
 

1988 births
Living people
Jamaican cricketers
Jamaica cricketers
Saint Lucia Kings cricketers
Place of birth missing (living people)